Parfondeval may refer to the following places in France:

 Parfondeval, Aisne
 Parfondeval, Orne